Deep Roots may refer to:
 Deep Roots (radio program), a Canadian radio program focusing on folk and roots music
 Deep Roots (Steven Curtis Chapman album), 2013
 Deep Roots (Lorez Alexandria album), 1962
 Deep Roots (novel), 2018 novel by Ruthanna Emrys